Gabriele is both a given name and a surname. Notable people with the name include:

Given name

Surname
Al Gabriele, American comic book artist
Angel Gabriele (1956–2016), American comic book artist
Corrado Gabriele (born 1966), Italian politician
Daniele Gabriele (born 1994), German-Italian footballer
Fabrizio Gabriele (born 1985), Italian rower
Ketty Gabriele (born 1981), Italian mobster
Lisa Gabriele, Canadian writer, television producer and journalist
Teresa Gabriele (born 1979), Canadian basketball player

See also
Gabrio, related Italian given name
Gabrielė, a feminine Lithuanian given name
Gabriel (disambiguation)
Gabrielle (disambiguation)

German feminine given names
Italian-language surnames
Italian masculine given names
Surnames from given names